Dichagyris amoena is a moth of the family Noctuidae. It is found in Turkey and Israel.

Adults are on wing in October. There is one generation per year.

External links
 Noctuinae of Israel

amoena
Moths of Asia
Moths of the Middle East
Moths described in 1892